Interstate 169 (I-169) is a  freeway that travels along the former southern section of the Pennyrile Parkway in Kentucky. The highway was designated on May 7, 2017, after President Donald Trump signed legislation designating the route. It travels north from a trumpet interchange with I-24 south of Hopkinsville to a cloverleaf interchange with its parent, I-69, and the Western Kentucky Parkway near Nortonville.

, I-169 is still signed as the Pennyrile Parkway. No signage for I-169 has yet been put up, although "Future I-169" signs are present along the route. I-169 signage is expected to be installed when required upgrades to the Parkway are completed.

Route description
The route begins at a trumpet interchange with I-24 near Hopkinsville. It runs northward into the city of Hopkinsville. After passing through, I-169 runs through farmland and the West Kentucky Coalfield, running roughly parallel to U.S. Route 41 (US 41) and bypassing numerous small towns before ending at a cloverleaf interchange with I-69 and the Western Kentucky Parkway and merging with I-69 through traffic.

History

The freeway was originally known solely as, and part of, the Edward T. Breathitt Pennyrile Parkway, one of the original nine parkways in the Kentucky parkway system, from its 1969 opening until May 7, 2017, when Congress officially designated the section from the I-24 junction in southern Christian County to the I-69/Western Kentucky Parkway junction near Nortonville. In addition to I-169's current alignment, the Pennyrile Parkway also traveled further northward to its original terminus in Henderson until most of that stretch of the Pennyrile was signed as I-69 in November 2015. US 41 followed the remaining routing of the Pennyrile Parkway from the Henderson Bypass exit to the US 41/US 60 junction in Henderson. After the I-169 designation was made official on May 7, 2017, the unsigned Kentucky Route 9004 (KY 9004) designation associated with the parkway was removed.

The first  was not built and completed until March 2011. The Pennyrile Parkway's original southern terminus was at the exit 7 interchange in Hopkinsville. Construction of that section was built in phases from 2009 to 2011. At some point in the early 2010s after I-69 was designated on the first  of the Western Kentucky Parkway, the current I-169 alignment was rumored to be a future I-24 spur instead, in which no plans were made.

Exit list

See also

References

Exterlink links

69-1
1 (Kentucky)
Transportation in Christian County, Kentucky
Transportation in Hopkins County, Kentucky